Le Mesnil-sous-Jumièges is a commune in the Seine-Maritime department in the Normandy region in north-western France.

Geography
A ferry boat carries cars and passengers across the river to Yville-sur-Seine.

Population

Places of interest
 The church of St.Philibert, dating from the sixteenth century.
 The fourteenth century manor house of Agnès Sorel, mistress of Charles VII.

See also
Communes of the Seine-Maritime department

References

External links

 Official commune website 
 A history website of Le Mesnil 

Communes of Seine-Maritime